Annette Melton is an Australian actress and television presenter. She has appeared in a US Discovery Channel series about female killers, Deadly Women; in a series six episode as Regina DeFrancisco and in a series eight episode as Gaile Owens. Melton has hosted televised motorsport productions such as the 2014 World Time Attack on Australia's free to air multicultural channel SBS and Motive TV on Foxtel. Her mixed-race beauty has seen her featured in FHM magazine, Maxim Magazine, on the cover of T3 and Acclaim magazines. In 2022 she was cast as Shannon in an Australian independent feature film, Get Free.

Filmography

External links
Annette Melton website.

References

Australian television actresses
Australian film actresses
People from the Sutherland Shire
Actresses from Sydney
Australian female models
Living people
Year of birth missing (living people)